Percy Kemshed Hanger (1889–1939) was an English professional football centre half who played in the Football League for Leicester Fosse.

Personal life 
Hanger's brother Harry was also a footballer.

Career statistics

References

English footballers
English Football League players
Association football wing halves
1889 births
1939 deaths
Sportspeople from Kettering
Kettering Town F.C. players
Leicester City F.C. players
Stamford A.F.C. players